Lost in Space Part I & II is a compilation album by German band Avantasia, released in 2008. The album contains tracks from Avantasia's EPs Lost in Space Part I and Lost in Space Part II and an expanded version of the title-song, featuring Michael Kiske.

Track listing 
"Lost In Space" (3:52)
"Lay All Your Love on Me" (ABBA cover) (4:23)
"Another Angel Down" (5:42)
"The Story Ain't Over" (4:59)
"Return To Avantasia" (0:47)
"Ride The Sky" (Lucifer's Friend cover) (2:55)
"Promised Land" (4:52)
"Dancing with Tears in My Eyes" (Ultravox cover) (3:53)
"Scary Eyes" (3:32)
"In My Defence" (Freddie Mercury cover) (3:58)
"Lost In Space" (Alive at Gatestudio) (4:36)
"Lost In Space" (Extended Version) (5:08)

Track 1 originally from Lost in Space Part I and Lost in Space Part II
Tracks 2 through 6 originally from Lost in Space Part I 
Tracks 7 through 11 originally from Lost in Space Part II
Track 12 originally exclusive for iTunes

Personnel
 Tobias Sammet - Lead vocals, bass 
 Sascha Paeth - Rhythm guitars, lead guitars (Tracks 1−2, 4−6, 10−12)
 Eric Singer - Drums, vocals (Track 6)
 Michael "Miro" Rodenberg - Keyboards, orchestration

Guest vocalists
 Jørn Lande (Tracks 3, 7)
 Bob Catley (Track 4)
 Amanda Somerville (Tracks 1, 4, 10)
 Michael Kiske (Track 7, 12)

Guest musicians
 Henjo Richter - Lead guitars (Tracks 3, 7−9)

Avantasia albums
2008 compilation albums